Rotterdam Centraal railway station is the main railway station of the city Rotterdam in South Holland, Netherlands. The station received an average of 112,000 passengers daily in 2019. The current station building, located at Station Square, was officially opened in March 2014.

History

Before World War II, Rotterdam did not have a central railway station - instead there were four stations in and around the city centre:
Rotterdam Delftsche Poort: for westbound trains towards Schiedam, Den Haag HS and Amsterdam CS and eastbound trains towards Dordrecht
Rotterdam Beurs: towards Dordrecht, connected to Delftsche Poort
Rotterdam Maas: terminus for eastbound trains to Gouda and Utrecht
Rotterdam Hofplein: terminus for the Hofpleinlijn, an alternative line to Den Haag HS, also going to Scheveningen.

Delftse Poort station was badly damaged by bombing in the Rotterdam Blitz. The new Centraal station was rebuilt just westwards of the site. Its original building was designed by architect Sybold van Ravesteyn and was completed on 13 March 1957, officially opening on 21 May. Maas station had closed in 1953 and trains from Utrecht were diverted to Centraal station via the new Rotterdam Noord station. However, the Hofpleinlijn (which later became part of RandstadRail) continued to bypass the station. Hofplein station was eventually closed in 2010 after the Hofpleinlijn was redirected through a tunnel and connected to Centraal station for the first time.

On 9 February 1968 Princess Beatrix opened the first metro line in the Netherlands at Centraal station. The line connected the station to the south of Rotterdam and is now known as Line D. The first subway station had an island platform with two tracks. On 28 September 2009, a new and more spacious underground station opened right next to the old one, which was immediately demolished. The new station has two island platforms with three tracks.

The mainline station nowadays has seven island platforms with thirteen platform tracks. There are three tracks without platform (tracks 2, 5 and 10). In 2007, it was used by approximately 110,000 passengers a day.

The 1957 station building was closed in 2007 and demolished the next year - making it the first major post-war railway station in the Netherlands to be taken down to make way for a new one. The new station was completed and opened in 2014.

New Rotterdam Centraal
A total reconstruction of the station and its surroundings started in 2004 to cope with an increasing number of trains, for example the high-speed train between Amsterdam, Brussels and Paris, and to accommodate for RandstadRail. Furthermore, the existing station, especially the passenger tunnel, also became too small to handle the growing number of passengers. Traveller numbers were projected to be 320,000 per day in 2025. To cope with this increase, a new station was necessary.

In June 2004, ProRail, NS and the Municipality of Rotterdam awarded the contract to Team CS, a cooperative between Benthem Crouwel Architekten, MVSA Meyer & Van Schooten Architects, and West 8, for transforming the existing plans into a design for the new Central Station.

On 16 May 2006 Mayor Ivo Opstelten revealed a work of Onno Poiesz consisting of the word EXIT, which was mounted behind the windows of the facade. Some of the letters "CENTRAAL STATION" that stood on the roof of the station until its closing were put in a different order by Peter Hopman and Margien Reuvekamp of Bureau Lakenvelder to read "TRAAN LATEN" ("SHED A TEAR"). The final closure of the outdated station took place on 2 September 2007 in the presence of Mayor Opstelten, to allow for the demolition of the station. Between 16 January 2008 and the end of March 2008 the station was completely demolished.

Passengers then, for years, had to use amenities housed in a temporary shelter, a smurf-blue building complex on Conrad Street on the northeast corner of the Groothandelsgebouw. The bicycle tunnel served as a temporary passenger tunnel. On 28 November 2012 the six-times-as-large, new passenger tunnel opened, and on 28 August 2013 the renovated bicycle tunnel opened; the so-called biscuits - artworks that had adorned the wings of the former Central Station - are now above the ends of the bicycle tunnel. The full completion of the station was on 13 March 2014, when the station was reopened by King Willem-Alexander. Rotterdam Centraal Station, as the station is now officially called - on the south side, at the explicit request of the citizens of Rotterdam, the name Centraal Station in the lettering that architect Van Ravensteyn had put on the old station, has returned - will obtain the status of world station, as it is on the international high-speed railway towards Belgium. Some modifications to accommodate security screening of Eurostar passengers from the UK were made and finished in March 2018.

In addition to the railway station, the old metro station of Rotterdam Centraal with two tracks and an island platform was renewed and extended to accommodate for the light rail connection to The Hague Central Station. The location of the former island platform is now occupied by switches. The tracks of the RandstadRail Metro Line E were connected to the rest of the metro network with a new tunnel at Rotterdam Central Station. The new metro station has three tracks and two island platforms. Track 1 serves metro line E, part of RandstadRail in the direction Den Haag Central Station. Track 2 is for metro line E towards Slinge; additional services between Slinge - Rotterdam Central vv also use track 2 as terminus of metro line D. Track 3 is between the two island platforms; uniquely the doors of the subway open on both sides while halting at this platform. The latter track is used as the starting point of Metro Line D to the Akkers. On 28 September 2009 the new metro station was opened, after it had been closed for two days. The connection for RandstadRail was officially opened on 16 August 2010, a day after it was available for passenger service.

On 26 March 2014, one of the 60-year-old trees that had to 'move' to allow for the renovation of the station area was placed on Conrad Street.

On 4 February 2020, the Minister of Infrastructure and Water Management, Cora van Nieuwenhuizen, and the UK Transport Secretary, Grant Shapps, announced that juxtaposed controls would be established in the station. According to the announcement, starting from 18 May 2020, Eurostar passengers travelling to the UK would clear exit checks from the Schengen Area as well as UK entry checks (conducted by the UK Border Force) in the station before boarding their train (without having to disembark at Brussels-South station, go through the juxtaposed controls there, and board another train to the UK). However, the launch was postponed due to the COVID-19 pandemic. The inauguration of juxtaposed controls in the station subsequently took place on 26 October 2020.

Destinations
As it is one of the four main stations in the Netherlands it is well connected with cities all over the country. Major destinations include:

Amsterdam, Amersfoort, Bergen op Zoom, Breda, Dordrecht, Delft, The Hague (Den Haag), Eindhoven, Gouda, Groningen, Haarlem, Leeuwarden, Leiden, Middelburg, Roosendaal, Tilburg, Utrecht, Venlo, Vlissingen and Zwolle.

There are also international services to Antwerp, Brussels and Paris up to 14 times a day and to Disneyland Paris twice per day.

Eurostar services from London to Amsterdam Centraal also call here. Direct services to London were due to start on 18 May 2020, but this was postponed to 26 October due to the COVID-19 pandemic.

Train services

, the following train services call at this station:
International service
Thalys: Amsterdam – Rotterdam Central – Antwerp – Brussels – Chambéry – Bourg-Saint-Maurice (in winter)
Thalys: Amsterdam – Rotterdam Central – Antwerp – Brussels – Avignon – Marseille (in summer)
Thalys: Amsterdam – Rotterdam Central – Antwerp – Brussels – Paris
Thalys: Amsterdam – Rotterdam Central – Antwerp – Brussels – Aéroport Charles de Gaulle - Marne-la-Vallée-Chessy
Eurostar: Amsterdam – Rotterdam Central – Brussels – London
Intercity Direct: Amsterdam – Schiphol – Rotterdam Central – Breda – Noorderkempen – Antwerp – Mechelen – Brussels Airport Zaventem  – Brussels South/Midi
Intercity : The Hague HS – Rotterdam Central – Breda – Noorderkempen – Antwerp – Mechelen – Brussels Airport Zaventem  – Brussels South/Midi
Express services
Intercity: Rotterdam Central – Gouda – Utrecht – Amersfoort – Zwolle – Assen – Groningen
Intercity: Rotterdam Central – Gouda – Utrecht – Amersfoort – Zwolle – Meppel – Steenwijk – Heerenveen – Leeuwarden
Intercity Direct: Amsterdam – Schiphol – Rotterdam Central – Breda
Intercity Direct: Amsterdam – Schiphol – Rotterdam Central
Intercity: The Hague – Delft – Rotterdam Central – Breda  – Tilburg – Eindhoven
Nachtnet: Rotterdam Central – Gouda/Delft – The Hague HS – Leiden – Schiphol – Amsterdam – Utrecht
Intercity: Vlissingen – Middelburg – Goes – Bergen op Zoom – Roosendaal – Dordrecht – Rotterdam Central – Schiedam – Delft – The Hague HS – Leiden – Haarlem – Amsterdam
Intercity: Dordrecht – Rotterdam Central – Schiedam – Delft – The Hague HS – Leiden – Schiphol – Amsterdam Zuid – Duivendrecht – Almere – Lelystad **
Intercity: Rotterdam Central – Gouda – Utrecht
Nachtnet: Rotterdam Central – Dordrecht – Breda  – Tilburg – Eindhoven
Only during evening and on Sundays:
Intercity: Dordrecht – Rotterdam – Schiedam – Delft – The Hague HS – Leiden – Schiphol – Amsterdam Zuid – Amsterdam Bijlmer ArenA – Utrecht – 's-Hertogenbosch – Eindhoven – Helmond – Deurne – Horst Sevenum – Blerick – Venlo**
Local services
Sprinter: Uitgeest – Zaandam – Amsterdam – Breukelen – Woerden – Gouda – Rotterdam Central
Sprinter: The Hague – Delft – Rotterdam Central – Dordrecht
Sprinter: The Hague – Delft – Rotterdam Central – Dordrecht
Sprinter: Rotterdam Central – Gouda – Gouda Goverwelle

Metro services
Rotterdam Centraal currently serves as a terminus for metro line D, while line E trains continue further north to Voorburg and The Hague, sharing the section between Rotterdam Centraal and Slinge with line D. The trains are operated by RET.

Tram services
The station is served by almost all lines in the Rotterdam tramway network (4, 7, 8, 12, 20, 21, 23, 24 and 25) and are operated by RET

The routes of the trams are as follows:

Bus services
33 Rotterdam Centraal - Blijdorp Zoo - Overschie - Rotterdam-The Hague Airport - Meijersplein Metro
38 Crooswijk - Rotterdam Centraal - Oud-Mathenesse - Schiedam Centrum
40 Rotterdam Centraal - Blijdorp Zoo - Overschie - Delft University - Delft
44 Rotterdam Centraal - Erasmus University Medical Center - Carnisse - Zuidplein
Eurolines
Flixbus

There are also 13 nightbus lines operating every Friday and Saturday.

Amenities
The new travelers passage includes two supermarkets, a HEMA, a range of take-away food options, and two branches of Starbucks. There is also a "Station Living room". The south side features an underground bicycle parking for over 5,000 bicycles. Both the north and the south side have taxi stops. Under the Kruisplein an underground parking garage has been built with a water storage facility on top; This garage is accessible from the south (=west-east) tube of the Weena Tunnel and will be connected to the parking garage under the Schouwburgplein.

See also
RandstadRail
Nederlandse Spoorwegen

References

External links 

Rotterdam Centraal
NS website
Dutch Public Transport journey planner
RET website
 RET Network Map
 Live train departures for Rotterdam Centraal station

Centraal
Railway stations opened in 1847
Rotterdam Metro stations
Railway stations on the Hoekse Lijn
Railway stations on the Oude Lijn
Railway stations on the Staatslijn I
Railway stations served by Eurostar
RandstadRail stations in Rotterdam
1847 establishments in the Netherlands
Juxtaposed border controls
Railway stations in the Netherlands opened in 1847